The 1966 Paris–Nice was the 24th edition of the Paris–Nice cycle race and was held from 8 March to 15 March 1966. The race started in Paris and finished in Nice. The race was won by Jacques Anquetil of the Ford France team.

General classification

References

1966
1966 in road cycling
1966 in French sport
March 1966 sports events in Europe
1966 Super Prestige Pernod